Adrianna Hicks is a musical theatre actor known for originating the roles of Catherine of Aragon in the Broadway production of SIX and Sugar in the musical adaptation of Some Like It Hot.
She has also appeared in Aladdin and The Color Purple, the latter of which marked her Broadway debut.

Early life 
Hicks was raised in McKinney, Texas. She grew up singing in church choirs, leading to her developing a love of music. She later learned to play flute, playing in her school band. As a sophomore at McKinney High School, she was introduced to musical theater and was immediately drawn to it.

In 2011, she received her Bachelor of Fine Arts in Musical Theatre from the University of Oklahoma Weitzenhoffer School of Musical Theatre, where she was awarded a scholarship by the Congressional Black Caucus.

Career 
Hicks began her professional career in Germany with Stage Entertainment. While in Germany, she performed in “Dirty Dancing — The Classic Story on Stage” and Sister Act (musical). She also performed in Legally Blonde (musical) in Austria.

In 2015, Hicks made her Broadway debut in The Color Purple (musical) as a swing. After acting in Aladdin, Hicks returned to The Color Purple in the national tour, where she played Celie. She returned to the role in 2018 at the Paper Mill Playhouse in a production directed by John Doyle.

In 2019, Hicks joined the North American premiere cast of Six (musical) as Catherine of Aragon. She continued with the cast to the 2020 Broadway previews and eventual 2021 opening following the closing of Broadway due to the COVID-19 pandemic. For their performances, Hicks and her co-stars received the newly created Drama Desk Ensemble Award.  

On August 7, 2022, Hicks left Six to join the cast of the new musical Some Like It Hot (musical) as Sugar, the role originally played in the movie by Marilyn Monroe.

Theatre credits

References

External links 

 
 
 
 
 

University of Oklahoma alumni
21st-century American actresses
Actresses from Texas
American stage actresses
Living people
1989 births